Little Grass Valley is a census-designated place in Plumas County, California, USA.  As of the 2010 census, it had a total population of 2.

Geography
Although the Bureau states there is no water, the lake covers about 1600 acres (6.5 km2 or 2.5 sq mi).

Demographics

2010
The 2010 United States Census reported that Little Grass Valley had a population of 2. The population density was 0.2 people per square mile (0.1/km2). The racial makeup of Little Grass Valley was 2 (100.0%) White, 0 (0.0%) African American, 0 (0.0%) Native American, 0 (0.0%) Asian, 0 (0.0%) Pacific Islander, 0 (0.0%) from other races, and 0 (0.0%) from two or more races.  Hispanic or Latino of any race were 0 persons (0.0%).

The Census reported that 2 people (100% of the population) lived in households, 0 (0%) lived in non-institutionalized group quarters, and 0 (0%) were institutionalized.

There were 1 households, out of which 0 (0%) had children under the age of 18 living in them, 1 (100%) were opposite-sex married couples living together, 0 (0%) had a female householder with no husband present, 0 (0%) had a male householder with no wife present.  There were 0 (0%) unmarried opposite-sex partnerships, and 0 (0%) same-sex married couples or partnerships. 0 households (0%) were made up of individuals, and 0 (0%) had someone living alone who was 65 years of age or older. The average household size was 2.00.  There were 1 families (100% of all households); the average family size was 2.00.

The population was spread out, with 0 people (0%) under the age of 18, 0 people (0%) aged 18 to 24, 0 people (0%) aged 25 to 44, 2 people (100%) aged 45 to 64, and 0 people (0%) who were 65 years of age or older.  The median age was 55.5 years. For every 100 females, there were 100.0 males.  For every 100 females age 18 and over, there were 100.0 males.

There were 159 housing units at an average density of 15.9 per square mile (6.1/km2), of which 1 (100%) were owner-occupied, and 0 (0%) were occupied by renters. The homeowner vacancy rate was 0%; the rental vacancy rate was 0%.  2 people (100% of the population) lived in owner-occupied housing units and 0 people (0%) lived in rental housing units.

Pre-2010
Little Grass Valley was initially occupied by the Maidu Native American tribe during the summers.  During the California Gold Rush, it became a mining camp. The camp disappeared before 1900, but there are still gold mines in the area. The land in the valley was used to graze cattle and there was a Boy Scout Camp located on the banks of the South Fork of the Feather River. In 1963 the whole area was flooded and a lake filled the valley.  Today there are campgrounds all around the lake, cabins on the south side, and it is the center of a snowmobiling area. It is about three miles (5 km) from La Porte (population 43).

Politics

Fowler Lake

See also
 Grass Valley, California

References

Sources
Little Grass Valley Lake Recreation Area

Census-designated places in Plumas County, California
Populated places in the Sierra Nevada (United States)